Vijfsluizen is an above-ground of Rotterdam Metro line C. The station is located in the Vlaardingen area of the City of Schiedam, adjoining Rotterdam. It was designed by Zwarts & Jansma architects and entered service with the opening of the line on 4 November 2002. Vijfsluizen station is an important transfer point between the metro and buses.

Rotterdam Metro stations
Buildings and structures in Schiedam
Railway stations opened in 2002
2002 establishments in the Netherlands
Railway stations in the Netherlands opened in the 21st century